Juan Severino Somoza (born 16 September 1981) is an Argentine-born Portuguese rugby union footballer. He plays as a lock or as a flanker.

He was a member of Agronomia team, winning the title of National Champion in 2006/2007. He played also for the Italian semi-professional team of Rugby Reggio.

He decided to represent Portugal, and was selected for the 2007 Rugby World Cup finals squad. He played a single game with Scotland. He head-butted a Scottish player, being suspended for four weeks after the incident.

Severino had 50 caps for the "Lobos", from 2006 to 2013, with a try scored, five points in aggregate.

External links

1981 births
Living people
Argentine rugby union players
Portuguese rugby union players
Argentine emigrants to Portugal
Rugby union flankers
Rugby union locks
Portugal international rugby union players
UE Santboiana players
Expatriate rugby union players in Spain
Argentine expatriate rugby union players
Portuguese expatriate rugby union players
Argentine expatriate sportspeople in Spain
Portuguese expatriate sportspeople in Spain